The 2013 FIA WTCC Race of Austria was the fifth round of the 2013 World Touring Car Championship season and the second running of the FIA WTCC Race of Austria. It was held on 19 May 2013 at the Salzburgring in Salzburg, Austria.

Both races were won from pole position with Michel Nykjær taking victory in the first race for NIKA Racing and James Nash won race two, the first victory in the World Touring Car Championship for both himself and the bamboo-engineering team. This was the first time in WTCC history that both races in a weekend were won by drivers eligible for the Yokohama Independents' Trophy.

The round is best remembered for a qualifying incident where all twelve cars in the second part of qualifying drove slowly around the lap before what was supposed to be their final flying lap. The cars drove slowly around the lap in order to ensure themselves a slipstream for the next lap but all of them missed the checkered flag. A total of fourteen drivers were penalised after the session which drastically reshuffled the grid.

Background
Coming into the Austrian round Yvan Muller was leading the world drivers' championship and Nash was leading the Yokohama Independents' Trophy.

The Honda Civic WTCCs gained 10 kg of ballast when the compensation weights were revised, pulling them on the maximum ballast of 1,190 kg equal to the Chevrolet Cruze 1.6Ts. The SEAT León WTCCs gained 10 kg to take their weight up to 1,160 kg and the BMW 320 TCs returned to their base weight of 1,150 kg.

Special Tuning Racing elected to miss the Austrian and Russian rounds in order to fix their car which had been plagued with issues since the Race of Morocco.

Following his crash in Hungary, Gabriele Tarquini was allowed by the FIA to run a new engine in his Honda Civic without a penalty.

Report

Free practice
Muller topped the opening practice session leading a Chevrolet 1–2–3 ahead of Tom Chilton and Alex MacDowall. Robert Huff was the fastest SEAT in fourth and Norbert Michelisz was fifth in his Zengő Motorsport Honda while the works drivers were both outside the top ten. Darryl O'Young did not set a time during the session due to a turbo problem on his ROAL Motorsport BMW 320 TC.

Muller led Huff in the second free practice session, Nash in third was the fastest independent driver. James Thompson didn't set any times and spent the entire session in the pit lane while Hugo Valente stopped on track with five minutes to go.

Qualifying
Chilton led the first session which had seen a number of incidents. Tom Coronel locked up and avoided hitting Pepe Oriola. Oriola then had a collision with the rear of Charles Ng with both sustaining minor bodywork damage. Many of the drivers were trying to get into the slipstream of other cars and towards the end of the session, a group of cars led by Tarquini were slowed as they came round to start a flying lap with Coronel being caught out by the slow moving cars ahead and being launched over the Campos Racing SEAT of Valente. Thompson had parked his car on the exit of the first corner due to steering problems. At the end of the session, Marc Basseng went wide at the final corner and clipped the barriers on the outside before spinning to a halt in front of the pit entry.

All twelve cars formed up for a final flying lap in Q2 with Chilton at the front. Chilton had been going around the lap slowly and with the cars behind looking for a slipstream, nobody overtook. None of the cars made it around to the start line before the checkered flag came out, some of cars dived straight into the pits while others carried on. Coronel had continued and lost the rear of his BMW on one of the fast corners and went backwards into the tyre wall. At the end of the session with an RML 1–2 with Muller ahead of Chilton. Huff was third and MacDowall in fourth was the leading independent. Nash was tenth and claimed the pole position for race two.

After the session, fourteen drivers were called the stewards. All the drivers who took part in Q2 bar Nykjær plus O'Young, Valente and Mikhail Kozlovskiy were summoned. Twelve drivers were deemed to be guilty of unsporting behaviour. Tarquini lost twelve places, Oriola lost eight places and Coronel dropped fifteen places. Muller, Chilton, Michelisz and Tiago Monteiro lost twelve places, Huff received a ten place penalty, MacDowall moved down eight places while Stefano D'Aste, O'Young and Valente all lost five places on the grid. WTCC General Manager Marcello Lotti commented on the incident during the warm–up session the following morning and confirmed the penalties would be applied to race one only.

After qualifying the Honda cars were found to be running illegal rear wings, Tarquini, Monteiro and Michelisz were sent to the back of the grid for race one.

Warm-Up
Thompson was quickest in the warm–up session on Sunday morning. D'Aste ended his session in the gravel early on. Nash suffered a puncture and Kozlovskiy spun but neither sustained damage to their cars and continued in the session.

Race One
Nykjær led away from pole position at the rolling start with Nash challenging him for the lead. Nykjær, Nash and Bennani broke away from the rest of the field while Kozlovskiy who had started fourth was dropping back and was soon behind teammate Thompson. Fredy Barth held fifth place after a number of attempts by MacDowall to get past. Barth was passed and then regained the position twice, first on the back straight and then at the first chicane. Another attempted pass by MacDowall on the back straight allowed Muller to take the pair of them. Muller set off after the leaders and eventually caught Bennani who was demoted to fourth place. Muller's teammate Chilton was battling over the final four points positions with Huff, Thompson and Coronel and he came out ahead in seventh place. There was a coming together between the Liqui Moly Team Engstler cars in the final laps when Ng tried to go up the inside of Engstler in the final sector, they made contact which spun Engstler around who then collided with O'Young. The third sector was covered by yellow flags for the final few laps, reducing passing opportunities for the leaders who were running close together. By the final lap Muller had caught the leading pair and they were bumper to bumper but he couldn't make a move, Nykjær won ahead of Nash and Muller. Thompson finished ninth behind Chilton and Huff to secure his second points finish of the year with Coronel coming from nineteenth to tenth.

Race Two
Nash was on pole position but he was overtaken my Michelisz before the first corner but retook the lead before the end of the lap. Chilton retired in the pit lane after a collision at the first chicane. MacDowall and Thompson were also caught out and ran through the escape road to return to the circuit. Nash was leading Michelisz and Monteiro but Muller who had started tenth was closing in on the Hondas. His first attempt at passing Monteiro was unsuccessful but with the Chevrolet's superior speed on the back straight the RML driver was able to make the pass stick the following lap. Tarquini had dropped back down the field and was defending eighth place from Huff who was unable to pass the Honda driver. Monteiro in fourth was defending his position from Nykjær in the final laps while on the penultimate lap Muller passed Michelisz; he couldn't catch Nash who claimed his first overall WTCC victory and the first for bamboo–engineering.

Results

Qualifying

Bold denotes Pole position for second race.

Race 1

Bold denotes Fastest lap.

Race 2

Bold denotes Fastest lap.

Standings after the event

Drivers' Championship standings

Yokohama Independents' Trophy standings

Manufacturers' Championship standings

 Note: Only the top five positions are included for both sets of drivers' standings.

References

External links
World Touring Car Championship official website

Austria
Race of Austria